The Mayor of Annapolis is the chief political figure in the city of Annapolis, which is the capital city of Maryland.  The mayor is elected to a four-year term.

List of Mayors of Annapolis
1708–1720 	Amos Garrett
1720–1721 	Thomas Larkin
1721–1722 	Benjamin Tasker
1722–1726 	Vachel Denton
1726–1727 	Benjamin Tasker
1727–1745 	Vachel Denton
1745–1746 	Robert Gordon
1746–1747 	Michael MacNamara
1747–1748 	Benjamin Tasker
1748–1749 	John Ross
1749–1750 	John Bullen
1750–1753 	Benjamin Tasker
1753–1754 	Michael MacNamara
1754–1755 	Benjamin Tasker, Jr.
1755–1756 	John Brice, Jr.
1756–1757 	Benjamin Tasker
1757–1758 	John Bullen
1758–1759 	John Ross
1759–1760 	Dr George H. Steuart
1760–1761 	Michael MacNamara (MacNamara left Annapolis for England in April, 1761)
1761–1762 	Stephen Bordley (elected to serve out the rest of MacNamara's term)
1762–1763 	John Brice, Jr.
1763–1764 	Dr George H. Steuart
1764–1765 	Daniel Dulany
1765–1766 	John Ross
1766–1767 	Walter Dulany
1767–1768 	Upton Scott
1771–1772 	Thomas Jennings
1773–1780 	Allen Quynn
1780–1781 	John Brice III
1781–1782 	John Bullen
1782–1783 	James Brice
1783–1784 	Jeremiah Townly Chase
1784–1785 	Nicholas Carroll
1785–1786 	Robert Couden
1786–1787 	Allen Quynn
1787–1788 	James Brice
1788–1789 	John Bullen
1789–1790 	Nicholas Carroll
1790–1791 	Robert Couden
1791–1792 	Allen Quynn
1792–1793 	John Bullen
1793–1794 	James Williams
1794–1795 	William Pinkney
1795–1796 	Allen Quynn
1796–1797 	John Bullen
1797–1798 	Philip Barton Key
1798–1799 	Nicholas Carroll
1799–1800 	John Davidson
1800–1801 	James Williams
1801–1802 	Allen Quynn
1802–1803 	Samuel Ridout
1803–1804 	John Johnson
1804–1805 	James Williams
1805–1806 	Samuel Ridout
1806–1807 	Burton Whetcroft
1807–1808 	John Kilty
1808–1809 	Burton Whetcroft
1809–1810 	John Johnson
1810–1811 	Nicholas Brewer
1811–1812 	Gideon White
1812–1813 	Nicholas Brewer
1813–1814 	John Randall
1814–1815 	Nicholas Brewer
1815–1816 	John Randall
1816–1817 	Nicholas Brewer
1817–1818 	John Randall
1818–1819 	Nicholas Brewer
1819–1823 	Lewis Duvall
1823–1825 	James Boyle
1825–1828 	Richard Harwood of Thomas
1828–1837 	Dr. Dennis Claude
1837–1840 	John Miller
1840–1843 	Alexander Contee Magruder
1843–1845 	Richard Swann
1845–1846 	William Bryan
1846–1848 	Richard Swann
1848–1849 	Richard Goodwin
1849–1851 	Dr. Abram Claude
1851–1852 	Brice Worthington
1852–1853 	Richard Goodwin
1853–1854 	Dr. Dennis Claude
1854–1855 	Dr. Abram Claude
1855–1856 	Nicholas Brewer, III
1856–1858 	Richard Swann
1858–1859 	Joseph Brown
1859–1860 	William Harwood
1860–1862 	John Magruder
1862–1863 	Wesley White
1863–1864 	John Magruder
1864–1865 	Solomon Phillips
1865–1866 	Richard Goodwin
1866–1867 	Richard Swann
1867–1869 	Dr. Abram Claude
1869–1870 	Augustus Gassaway
1870–1871 	John Hyde (D)
1871–1875 	James Munroe
1875–1877 	Arthur Wells
1877–1879 	James Brown
1879–1883 	Thomas Martin
1883–1889 	Dr. Abram Claude
1889–1893 	James Brown
1893–1897 	John Thomas
1897–1899 	Dr. Richard Green
1899 	Nevett Steele (Steele was elected mayor February 13, 1899, to fill the unexpired term of Green, who had died the month before. Steele served until the election of Seidewitz in July.)
1899–1901 	Edwin Seidewitz
1901–1903 	Charles Dubois (R)
1903–1905 	Samuel Jones
1905–1907 	John Douw
1907–1909 	Gordon Claude (D)
1909–1919 	James F. Strange (D)
1919–1921 	John Levy (D)
1921–1923 	Samuel Jones
1923–1925 	Charles Smith
1925–1927 	Allen Bowie Howard (D)
1927–1929 	Charles Smith
1929–1935 	Walter Quenstedt (R)
1935–1939 	Louis Phipps (D)
1939–1941 	George Haley (acting mayor, Jan. 17, 1939 to July 21, 1941)
1941–1949 	William McCready (D)
1949–1952 	Roscoe Rowe (R)
1952 	Robert Campbell, Sr. (acting mayor following Rowe's death, nine months of 1952)
1952–1961 	Arthur Ellington (D, acting mayor, Jan. 15 to July 20, 1953)
1961–1965 	Joseph Griscom, Sr. (R)
1965–1973  	Roger Moyer (D)
1973 	Noah Hillman (D, Served June 2 to 11; Moyer resigned 10 days before the end of his term as a way to honor Hillman, a long-time City Councilmen).
1973 – March 9, 1981 	John Apostol (R, resigned March 3, 1981)
March 9, 1981 – April 12, 1981  Gustav Akerland (R, Alderman and acting mayor following Apostol's resignation; died April 15, 1981).
April 12, 1981 – June 7, 1981 	John Thomas Chambers, Jr. (R, Alderman and acting mayor following Akerland's suicide; Annapolis’ first African-American Mayor).
1981–1985 	Richard Lazer Hillman (R)
1985–1989 	Dennis Callahan (D)
1989– December 1, 1997 	Alfred Hopkins (D)
December 1, 1997 – December 3, 2001 Dean Johnson (R)
December 3, 2001 – December 7, 2009 Ellen Moyer (D)
December 7, 2009 – December 2, 2013 Joshua Cohen (D)
December 2, 2013 – December 4, 2017 Mike Pantelides (R)
December 4, 2017 – Present Gavin Buckley (D)

References

 
 
 

Annapolis
Mayors
1708 establishments in Maryland